Maurice Motamed or Morris Motamed (born 1945) is an Iranian politician who was elected in 2000 and again in 2004 as a Jewish member of the Iranian Parliament (preceded by Manuchehr Eliasi and succeeded by Siamak Moreh Sedgh), representing the Jewish community which has by Iran's constitution retained a reserved seat since the Persian Constitution of 1906.

Career 

In Parliament, he has been active in defending Jews, Christians and Zoroastrians against discrimination. He also played a prominent role in the efforts to alleviate the sentences against some members of the Jewish community for alleged spying or illegally trying to flee the country.  He also served as a member of the Parliament's Energy Committee.

In various media, Motamed has regularly expressed his support for the official positions of the Iranian government on international affairs in order to stress the national loyalty of Iranian Jews for the country, including support for Iran nuclear program (he was a member of the Majlis energy commission).

With regard to Holocaust denial comments made by Iran's former president Mahmoud Ahmadinejad, Motamed has expressed significant concerns, noting that "Denial of such a great historical tragedy that is connected to the Jewish community can only be considered an insult to all the world's Jewish communities."  He also criticised Iranian television for broadcasting antisemitic programmes. He also added that, "The Iranian Jews have been present in this country for a long time, for some 2,700 [years]. During these 2,700 years they have always been in full understanding with the society, they've lived in friendship and brotherhood, so therefore I don't think that bringing up such an issue could damage the Jewish community in Iran."

See also
Persian Jews
Iranian Parliament religious minority reserved seats
Iran–Israel relations

References

External links 

 Reuters, Iran's religious minorities waning despite own MPs, February 16, 2000
 Agence France Presse, Islamic republic's non-Muslims stand behind Khatami, June 2, 2001 
 Associated Press, Iran O.K's Equalizing 'Blood Money', November 3, 2002
 Morris (Maurice) Motamed, A report on the activities of Iranian Jewish member of The Islamic Parliament, Ofegh Bina (Quarterly Magazine), Vol. 5, No. 21, Autumn 2003, pp.61-62

1945 births
Living people
Jewish Iranian politicians
Iranian Jews
Jewish Representatives in Islamic Consultative Assembly
Members of the 6th Islamic Consultative Assembly
Members of the 7th Islamic Consultative Assembly